Grimm & Co. was a two-story bakery (patisserie), restaurant, and dance hall in Surabaya, Indonesia. Opened in 1888, it was situated at Jalan Pasar Besar (Pasar Besar weg). The location is now the Tai Chan Restaurant.

Gallery

References

History of Indonesia
Companies based in Surabaya
Buildings and structures in Surabaya